Bihariganj Assembly constituency is an assembly constituency in Madhepura district in the Indian state of Bihar. Niranjan Kumar Mehta of Janata Dal (United) is the current MLA.

Overview
As per Delimitation of Parliamentary and Assembly constituencies Order, 2008, No. 71 Bihariganj Assembly constituency is composed of the following: Bihariganj and Gwalpara community development blocks; Biriranpal, Madhuban, Rampur Khora, Kishunganj, Pararia, Barahi Anadpura and Pipra Karoti gram panchayats of Uda Kishunganj CD Block; Gram Panchayats Haripur Kala, Digghi, Singiyon, Raghunathpur, Kolhaypatti Dumriya, Rajni, Gangapur, Dinapatti Sakhuwa, Pokhram Parmanadpur, Jorgama, and Rampur gram panchayats and Murliganj notified area of Murliganj CD Block.

Biharganj Assembly constituency is part of No. 13 Madhepura (Lok Sabha constituency).

Members of Legislative Assembly

Elections results

2020

See also
 Bihariganj
 Bihariganj (Community development block)

References

External links
 

Assembly constituencies of Bihar
Politics of Madhepura district